This is a test may refer to:
The testing of the Emergency Alert System
The testing of the former Emergency Broadcast System
This is a Test, a 2017 song by Armin van Buuren